TA-35 Index is an Israeli stock market index computed by the Tel Aviv Stock Exchange tracking the performance of 35 large companies listed on stock exchanges in Israel.

It is one of the most commonly followed equity indices in Israel, considered as the flagship index in Israel and as a proxy to the Israeli economy similarly to the S&P 500 in the USA

TA-25 was launched in January 1992, with a value of 100 points as a base value.

The index was expanded on February 12, 2017 to include 35 instead of 25 stocks, in an attempt to improve stability and therefore reduce risk for trackers and encourage foreign investment.

Composition 
The components of the index are:

Historic Values and Returns

See also 
TA-90 Index
TA-125 Index
Economy of Israel

References

External links 
Index TA-35 at the Tel Aviv Stock Exchange

Israeli stock market indices
Economy of Israel
Tel Aviv Stock Exchange